The Democratic Republic of the Congo at the 2015 All-Africa Games had athletes competing in taekwondo, table tennis, swimming, athletics, karate, badminton, cycling, basketball, boxing, judo and volleyball.

Tennis player Denis Indondo became the first DRC athlete to win a gold medal in the African Games since the Congolese boxer Jesus Kibunde had won a gold at the 1999 edition of the Games.Indondo offre une médaille d’or à la RDC .

References

Nations at the 2015 African Games
Democratic Republic of the Congo at the African Games